Quick, Let's Get Married (also known as The Confession) is a 1964 American comedy film directed by William Dieterle and starring Ginger Rogers, Ray Milland and Barbara Eden.

Plot
A madam (Rogers) helps a master thief (Milland) locate an ancient buried treasure.

Cast
 Ginger Rogers as Madame Rinaldi  
 Ray Milland as Mario Forni  
 Barbara Eden as Pia Pacelli  
 Walter Abel as The Thief  
 Pippa Scott as Gina  
 Elliott Gould as The Mute  
 Carl Schell as Beppo  
 Michael Ansara as Mayor Pablo  
 Cecil Kellaway as The Bishop  
 David Hurst as Gustave  
 Vinton Hayworth as Aguesta, Town Banker  
 Leonardo Cimino as Dr. Paoli 
 Carol Ann Daniels 
 Mara Lynn 
 Julian Upton 
 Michael Youngman 
 Jeremy Verity as Town Clerk

Production
The film was produced by Rogers' husband William Marshall in an attempt to revive her screen career. The film had a troubled production, with original director Victor Stoloff being replaced by Dieterle. It sat on the shelf for several years and did not get a full release until 1971.

References

Bibliography
 Monaco, James. The Encyclopedia of Film. Perigee Books, 1991.

External links
 

1964 films
1964 comedy films
American comedy films
Films directed by William Dieterle
Films shot in Jamaica
Films set in Italy
Treasure hunt films
1960s English-language films
1960s American films